KQAC (89.9 FM, "All Classical Portland") is an American classical radio station licensed to serve the community of Portland, Oregon. KQAC is owned by All Classical Public Media, Inc., a non-profit 501(c)(3) organization. This classical music service is broadcast 24/7 in the Portland metro area at 89.9, at 88.1 at the Oregon Coast and in the Columbia Gorge. It is available worldwide via the Internet.

KQAC, KQHR, and KQOC rely on support from their community. 93% of All Classical’s financial support comes directly from its community, which consists of listeners, nonprofit arts organizations, businesses and foundations in Portland, Vancouver, the central Oregon coast, and the Columbia Gorge. Additionally, a small portion of the station's annual budget comes from various foundation grants and from the Corporation for Public Broadcasting. All Classical has extensive volunteer support and an internship program.

KQAC broadcasts in the HD (hybrid) format. The station's live stream is available through its mobile app.

Programming

Programs produced by KQAC include:
Saturday Matinee: Saturday host Ed Goldberg plays a mix of opera, show tunes, film themes, comic operettas, and American band music.
The Concert Hall: John Pitman hosts a show of orchestral concert recordings.
Sunday Brunch: Hosted Suzanne Nance.
The Score: Host Edmund Stone explores classical music used in film. This program is syndicated in several cities in the United States and internationally.
Northwest Previews: Andrea Murray hosts a five-minute program every Friday highlighting local arts events for the upcoming weekend and week ahead. 
Club Mod: Host Andrea Murray explores modernism, past and present, on this two-hour Saturday night show.
Played in Oregon: Host Brandi Parisi celebrates the classical music scene in Oregon with a one-hour program each Sunday.
On Deck with Young Musicians: Every Saturday, host Christa Wessel showcases the young musicians who live and perform in the Pacific Northwest. 
Five Minutes of Joy: In five minutes or less, All Classical presents updates from their new JOY community initiative, including the Youth Roving Reporters, Where We Live, and Night Out projects.  
 Thursdays @ Three: Hosted by Christa Wessel, Thursdays @ Three broadcasts live performances of local and visiting artists.

Syndicated programs aired on KQAC include Composers Datebook and Metropolitan Opera.

Community Outreach

JOY (Joyous Outreach to You/th)

In Fall 2017, All Classical Portland launched JOY. JOY (Joyous Outreach to You/th) is All Classical Portland's outreach initiative consisting of five programs:
Youth Roving Reporters
Artist In Residence
2019 Artist in Residence: Hunter Noack, pianist 
2019 Young Artist in Residence: Taylor Yoon, cellist 
Where We Live: a bi-monthly radio program
Night Out: an event series

Music Feeds 
In Fall 2017, in association with its annual Fall fundraiser, All Classical Portland partnered with Olson & Jones Construction and the Oregon Food Bank to help provide meals to those in need. Throughout September 2017, each donation made to All Classical Portland triggered a third-party donation from Olson & Jones Construction directly to the Oregon Food Bank, which provided over 30,000 meals to individuals and families in need. All Classical Portland repeated this partnership in 2018.

History

In 1983, Portland Public Schools applied for a license to create an FM station that would reach a larger audience than its KBPS 1450 AM station.  Reed College's KRRC agreed to slightly shift its FM station, freeing up the 89.9 frequency space on the dial. All Classical KQAC, originally KBPS-FM, began broadcasting on August 1, 1983. The programming of the new KBPS-FM station consisted of NPR’s Morning Edition and All Things Considered, syndicated programming such as Pipedreams and Minnesota Orchestra, and educational programming. In the early years, all programming was pre-recorded.

By the mid-1980s, station production assistant Tania Thompson began live announcing during the morning hours. In 1986, John Pitman, a recent Benson Polytechnic High School graduate, began live announcing during the early evening hours. A third announcer was hired to work throughout the night beginning in 1988, eventually transforming All Classical 89.9 FM into a 24-hour classical music station.

The continued growth of the two KBPS stations (AM and FM) caused a space crisis. At the time, station manager Patricia Swenson and a team of community leaders initiated a campaign to build a new broadcast center with private funds. The new broadcast center was completed in 1992.

Before the new broadcast center was completed, Oregon voters passed a ballot measure authorizing limits on property tax rates in the state. As a result, the Portland Public Schools district faced severe budget cuts, which in turn decreased funding to the two stations of KBPS. Operating cuts caused NPR membership to be discontinued in 1993, and volunteers took a more active role in the station's operations. Pledge drives became the most viable option for the survival of the two public radio stations.

In 2003, Portland Public Schools announced that it was selling its KBPS FM broadcast license. All Classical 89.9 (then KBPS Public Radio Foundation) purchased the Federal Communications Commission (FCC) FM Broadcast License, ensuring that classical music would stay on the airwaves in Portland. The license cost $5.5 million, and a final payment of $337,500 was made on December 14, 2012, certifying this organization as debt-free.

Improvements and recent history

KQAC increased its power from 3,700 watts to 5,200 watts in January 2011, and to 5,900 watts in May 2011. The increase extended coverage in the Portland area by ten miles in all directions and improved reception.

All Classical’s identity and brand has suffered due to the station’s past relationship with Portland Public Schools and the common misconception that this music service is part of Oregon’s statewide public broadcasting organization. In 2009, CEO Jack Allen proposed returning the call letters KBPS back to Portland Public Schools (the BPS in KBPS stood for Benson Polytechnic School). As a result, and in order to avoid confusion, All Classical 89.9 changed its call letters to KQAC (AC = All Classical). KQAC FM changed its official name from KBPS Public Radio Foundation to All Classical Public Media, Inc. to reflect the change of ownership and the call letters. In 2012, Allen took additional steps to assure independence and brand clarity by engaging Jelly Helm, formerly of Wieden + Kennedy, to design a new identity and positioning statement. The final result was the branding "All Classical Portland – we love this music".
 
In late 2012, the station began the search for a new facility, a home for the next 10 to 20 years. All Classical Portland had long outgrown the facility designed in 1983, which lacked adequate working, meeting, creative and performance space.

In 2014, All Classical Portland moved to its new home in the Hampton Opera Center on the east bank of the Willamette River, just south of OMSI and adjacent to Portland's new Tilikum Crossing, Bridge of the People. The new facility matches the needs of the organization and includes a new performance space, the Roger O. Doyle Performance studio, which also is home to Thursdays @ Three, a weekly feature.

Over the 2015-2016 year, All Classical saw a 22% increase in weekly cumulative listeners according to data published by the Radio Research Consortium and Nielsen Audio.

As of 2018, All Classical grew its audience by 35% in the past four years, and the station has the largest per capita market share of any classical music station in the country.

ICAN 

On April 15, 2019, KQAC launched ICAN (International Children's Arts Network) on its HD2 subchannel (along with KQHR and KQOC's HD2 subchannels).

Repeater stations 

The station launched its first repeater, KQHR 90.1 FM, in the Hood River area in 2001. KQHR is the first radio station in the Columbia River Gorge with HD digital transmission.

In May 2008, the station launched its second repeater station, KQOC 88.1 FM, rebroadcasting its signal in Lincoln City and Newport on the Oregon coast. The KQOC signal reaches Tillamook and Cannon Beach to the north and Yachats to the south. KQOC Gleneden Beach moved to a new 150-foot tower and commenced broadcasting with a stronger signal January 17, 2013.

In the Fall of 2011, KQAC added an HD-only repeater station in McMinnville, Oregon. Also in 2011, KQHR moved from 90.1 FM to a stronger signal at 88.1 FM.

In April 2014, KQAC added a repeater station, KQMI 88.9 FM in Manzanita, Oregon, and October 2014 saw the addition of a repeater translator in Corvallis, Oregon at 95.7 FM.

See also
List of FM radio stations in the United States by call sign (initial letters KQ–KS)

References

CPB 2009 "My Source" Community Engagement Award
Public Radio Exchange: The Score with Edmund Stone
Portland Public Schools sell KBPS-FM (June 30, 2003)

External links

QAC
Classical music radio stations in the United States
QAC
Radio stations established in 1983
NPR member stations
1983 establishments in Oregon
Children's radio stations in the United States